Ulawa Island is an island in Solomon Islands. It is located near Malaita Island and belongs to Makira Ulawa Province. 

A dialect of the Sa'a language is spoken on Ulawa Island.

History
First recorded sighting by Europeans was by the Spanish expedition of Álvaro de Mendaña in May 1568. More precisely the sighting and also landing in Ulawa was due to a local voyage done by a small boat, in the accounts the brigantine Santiago, commanded by Alférez Hernando Enríquez and having Hernán Gallego as pilot. They charted it as La Treguada and reported that the name given to it by the natives was Uraba.

Transportation
The island is served by Ulawa Airport, with flights on Solomon Airlines. Its major port is in the Su'u Moli Harbour. With passenger and cargo boats making trips to the island once every week.

References

External links
Tolaha ni Qaoolana Mala Ulawa (1907) Portions of the Book of Common Prayer in Ulawa, digitized by Richard Mammana and Charles Wohlers

Islands of the Solomon Islands